A Call And Response is the debut album by British indie rock band The Longcut, released in the UK in June 2006 through Deltasonic Records.

Track listing

References 

The Longcut albums
2006 debut albums
Deltasonic albums